Fichier des personnes recherchées (File of Wanted People), or FPR, is a French database of criminals and wanted people run by the French Interior Ministry and used by the national police and other law enforcement agencies in France.

About
The FPR began as a paper filing system in 1969, and it included criminals ranging from mafia members to escaped prisoners.  The file is also consulted during applications for a national identity card, a passport, a residency card of a visa.

In 1995, the FPR was expanded to include missing people and abducted children.

Each file contains:

identity of the person sought;
physical description and photograph if available;
reason for the search;
instructions in case a wanted person is discovered.

The FPR contained 620,000 records as of 14 November 2018.

Cards
The FPR system includes 21 fiches — subfiles or cards that indicate additional special circumstances, such as:

E card: wanted by immigration officials  (police générale des étrangers)
IT card: banned in French territory (interdiction du territoire)
R card: residence in France forbidden (opposition à résidence en France)
TE card: entry into France forbidden (opposition à l'entrée en France)
AL card: mentally ill (aliénés)
M card: underage runaways (mineurs fugueurs)
V card: escaped criminals  (évadés)
S card: threat to national security (Sûreté de l'État)
PJ card: wanted by judicial police (recherches de police judiciaire) 
T card: debtors to the national treasury (débiteurs envers le Trésor)

See also

Law enforcement in France
Police and Judicial Co-operation in Criminal Matters

References

External links
 2010 Government decree covering the FPR

1969 establishments in France
National Police (France)
French criminals
Counterterrorism in France